Ruba is a genus of flies in the family Stratiomyidae.

Species
Ruba amboinensis (Brauer, 1882)
Ruba bimaculata Yang, Zhang & Li, 2014
Ruba cincta Brunetti, 1923
Ruba fuscipennis Enderlein, 1914
Ruba inflata Walker, 1859
Ruba maculipennis Yang, Zhang & Li, 2014
Ruba nigritibia Yang, Zhang & Li, 2014
Ruba opponens Walker, 1865
Ruba tarsalis James, 1948

References

Stratiomyidae
Brachycera genera
Taxa named by Francis Walker (entomologist)
Diptera of Asia
Diptera of Australasia